Zhu Yi (born 14 September 1977) is a Chinese former swimmer who competed in the 2000 Summer Olympics.

References

1977 births
Living people
Chinese male breaststroke swimmers
Olympic swimmers of China
Swimmers at the 2000 Summer Olympics
Medalists at the FINA World Swimming Championships (25 m)
Asian Games medalists in swimming
Asian Games gold medalists for China
Swimmers at the 1998 Asian Games
Medalists at the 1998 Asian Games
20th-century Chinese people